Duchess of St Albans is a title given to the wife of the Duke of St Albans. Women who have held the title include:

Diana Beauclerk, Duchess of St Albans (c.1679–1742), wife of Charles Beauclerk, 1st Duke of St Albans
Jane Beauclerk, Duchess of St Albans (c.1731-1778), wife of George Beauclerk, 3rd Duke of St Albans
Catherine Beauclerk, Duchess of St Albans (1742-1789), wife of Aubrey Beauclerk, 5th Duke of St Albans
Louisa Grace Beauclerk, Duchess of St Albans (1777-1816), wife of Aubrey Beauclerk, 6th Duke of St Albans
Maria Beauclerk, Duchess of St Albans (c.1779-1822), 2nd wife of William Beauclerk, 8th Duke of St Albans
Harriet Mellon, wife of William Beauclerk, 9th Duke of St Albans
Beatrix Beauclerk, Duchess of St Albans (1877-1953), wife of Osborne Beauclerk, 12th Duke of St Albans
Suzanne Beauclerk, Duchess of St Albans (1921-2010), wife of Charles Beauclerk, 13th Duke of St Albans

See also
 Duke of St Albans